The Algoma School District was a 'single room schoolhouse' school district located in Saskatchewan, Canada in the Rural Municipality of Oakdale.  The school was built on SE 3-33-22-W3.  The name Algoma was submitted to the Saskatchewan Department of Education by the Write brothers, after the district in Ontario from which they had migrated.  The school was built in 1914, and closed in June, 1946.  Since it was one of the earliest schools completed in the area, students from other districts also attended.  The school was enlarged in 1925, during which a basement was dug, and a furnace installed.  The school site was also treed at this time.  After the school was closed in 1946, it was sold to Bert Van Basten and used as a granary.

The first trustees of the district were Arthur Hamwood, James Wright, and Chester Lyster, who also acted as secretary-treasurer.  The first inspector was A. W Keith. 

The students from the school competed in softball, tennis, basketball, and music.  The school entered in Saskatchewan music festivals on three occasions, with the students winning diplomas.

Teachers

The following is a chronological list of teachers that taught at the Algoma school:
 Mr. McKnight
 Mr. Cambell
 Miss Prouse
 Mrs. Kurtin
 Miss Wilfort
 Mrs. Archie Elliot
 Miss Myrtle Foster
 Miss Phylis Webb
 Mrs. W. C. Sutherland
 Mr. Louis Jones
 Mr. Stanley Scott
 Miss Carmel Seay
 Mr. Robert Evans
 Miss Stack
 Miss Grace McKay
 Miss Joyce Bird
 Mrs. Lebedoff
 Miss Dorothy Weir
 Miss Majorie Jenn
 Miss June Campbell
 Miss Margery Mack
 Miss Jean Smith

Oakdale No. 320, Saskatchewan
School districts in Saskatchewan